The Anton Melik Geographical Institute was founded in 1946 by the Slovenian Academy of Sciences and Arts. In 1976 it was named after the Slovene geographer and academy member Anton Melik (1890–1966), who was the first head of the institute. Since 1981, the institute has been a member of the Research Center of the Slovenian Academy of Sciences and Arts. Until 1992 the institute was mainly engaged with researching glaciers, glacial and fluvial transformations of land surfaces, flooded areas, natural disasters, mountain farms, and social geography. Since 1993 the institute's main task has been to conduct geographical studies of Slovenia and its landscapes and to prepare basic geographical texts on Slovenia as a country and as part of the world.

Research is mostly directed toward physical, social, and regional geography and thematic cartography.

Facilities
It has nine organizational units:

 Department of Physical Geography 
 Department of Social Geography 
 Department of Regional Geography 
 Department of Natural Disasters 
 Department of Environmental Protection 
 Department of the Geographical Information System
 Department of Thematic Cartography 
 Geographical Museum
 Geographical Library

The institute houses a map collection and three specialized geographical collections: Landscapes of Slovenia, Settlements of Slovenia, and Glaciers of Slovenia. It is headquarters of the Commission for the Standardization of Geographical Names of the Government of the Republic of Slovenia (Komisija za standardizacijo zemljepisnih imen Vlade Republike Slovenije).

Publications
The institute publishes three scholarly publications. Geografija Slovenije (Geography of Slovenia) is a series of books that appears in Slovene once or twice a year. Acta Geographica Slovenica / Geografski Zbornik is a journal published twice a year in English and Slovene. The articles can be downloaded in Slovene or English from the journal homepage. Geografski informacijski sistemi v Sloveniji (Geographical Information Systems in Slovenia) is a bulletin published every second (even) year in Slovene.

See also 

 United Nations Conference on the Standardization of Geographical Names

External links 
 The Institute website

Geography of Slovenia
Research institutes in Slovenia
Slovenian Academy of Sciences and Arts
Geography organizations
Research institutes established in 1946
Scientific organizations in Ljubljana
1946 establishments in Slovenia